Neocurtimorda is a genus of beetles in the family Mordellidae, containing the following species:

 Neocurtimorda aequatorialis Franciscolo, 1953
 Neocurtimorda belcastroi Franciscolo, 1994
 Neocurtimorda conformis Franciscolo, 1953
 Neocurtimorda convexa Franciscolo, 1950
 Neocurtimorda distrigosa Franciscolo, 1955
 Neocurtimorda lugubris (Fahraeus, 1870)
 Neocurtimorda monostigma Franciscolo, 1953
 Neocurtimorda mordelloides Franciscolo, 1953
 Neocurtimorda nakanei Franciscolo, 1953
 Neocurtimorda perpusilla Franciscolo, 1953
 Neocurtimorda picicornis Franciscolo, 1953
 Neocurtimorda rufipalpis Franciscolo, 1953
 Neocurtimorda sexmaculata Franciscolo, 1953

References

Mordellidae